Farhad Ebrahimi (born Rajab Ebrahimi , 1935 – 9 February 2019) was an Iranian poet, writer, and songwriter of Azerbaijani music. His most important work is the lyrics to Ayrılıq ("Separation")  a song that has been performed by many Azerbaijani singers, such as Ali Salimi (who wrote the music), Rashid Behbudov, and Googoosh.

References

External links
 Ayrılıq at Azeri.org website

1935 births
2019 deaths
People from Ardabil
20th-century Iranian poets
Iranian songwriters
21st-century Iranian poets